Lee Ho-seok (born 21 May 1991) is a South Korean footballer who plays as attacking midfielder for Incheon United in K League 1.

Career
Lee was selected by Chungju Hummel FC in the 2014 K League draft, but he moved to Gyeongnam FC in less than a month.

References

External links 

1991 births
Living people
Association football midfielders
Association football forwards
South Korean footballers
Chungju Hummel FC players
Gyeongnam FC players
Daejeon Hana Citizen FC players
Incheon United FC players
Gimcheon Sangmu FC players
K League 1 players
K League 2 players